Etchemin was a language of the Algonquian language family, spoken in early colonial times on the coast of Maine. The word Etchemin is thought to be either French alteration of an Algonquian word for 'canoe' or a translation of Skidijn, the native word for people in use by the inhabitants of the St. John, Passamaquoddy and St. Croix Rivers.

The only known record of the Etchemin language is a list of the numbers from one to ten recorded by Marc Lescarbot in the early 17th century and published in his book The History of New France (1609). The numerals in the list match those of Malecite-Passamaquoddy, Eastern Abenaki, as well as languages of southern New England such as Wampanoag, but as a set they do not match any other Algonquian language. The Etchemin language disappeared not long after Lescarbot's visit, and it is unknown what became of the tribe. All other language records called 'Etchemin', under more detailed analysis, appear to be the neighboring Malecite-Passamaquoddy language.

References

External links
 Linguist List entry for Etchemin
 Native-languages.org
OLAC resources in and about the Etchemin language

Eastern Algonquian languages
Indigenous languages of the North American eastern woodlands
Languages of the United States
Extinct languages of North America
Languages attested from the 17th century
17th-century establishments in the Thirteen Colonies
Languages extinct in the 17th century
17th-century disestablishments in the Thirteen Colonies
Indigenous languages of North America